William Thomas Montgomery (May 29, 1940 – July 28, 2020) was an American businessman and conservative activist. He co-founded the conservative political organization Turning Point USA with Charlie Kirk; Montgomery became Kirk's mentor and worked mostly behind the scenes in Turning Point's early years.

Early life
Montgomery was born on May 29, 1940, in Lincoln, Nebraska, and grew up in Peoria, Illinois. He served in the United States Air Force Reserve.

Career and activism
Montgomery spent his working career in marketing. After retiring, he founded Turning Point USA with Charlie Kirk in 2012. He served on Turning Point's board and as its secretary and treasurer until spring of 2019. Montgomery met Kirk when the latter was 18, after hearing Kirk speak at a small college. Montgomery has been described as Kirk's mentor.

Death
He died of complications from COVID-19 in July 2020, at age 80. After his death, Turning Point USA deleted a tweet that mocked wearers of protective masks.

References

1940 births
2020 deaths
American activists
Deaths from the COVID-19 pandemic in Illinois
Conservatism in the United States
People from Lincoln, Nebraska
People from Peoria, Illinois